Fred John Allen (July 27, 1865  – February 2, 1917) was an American politician and lawyer from Maine. Allen, a Republican, served in the Maine Legislature from 1901 to 1908. Allen served two terms in the Maine House of Representatives from 1901 to 1904. Elected to the Maine Senate in 1904, Allen also was elected Senate President in 1907–1908.

Prior to Allen's time in politics, he attended Bowdoin College and served as superintendent of Sanford public schools.

Allen's brother, Amos L. Allen, spent 12 years in the United States Congress from Maine's 1st congressional district.

References

External links

1865 births
1917 deaths
People from Alfred, Maine
People from Sanford, Maine
Bowdoin College alumni
Maine lawyers
Members of the Maine House of Representatives
Presidents of the Maine Senate
19th-century American lawyers